is a Japanese football player who currently plays beach soccer for Tokyo Verdy.

Career
In his youth, Uesato played for Okinawa Minami FC. He was also part of his schools' football team playing for Miyakojima Municipal North Middle School and Miyako High School before playing professionally for Kyoto Sanga FC.
 He made his debut in J. League Division 1 with Kyoto Sanga in 2009.

After his Kyoto Sanga stint, he played for FC Ryukyu and later for Austrian club USV Allerheiligen. He then move to the Philippines to play for JPV Marikina at the United Football League and later, the Philippines Football League (PFL). In January 2018, he moved to Ceres–Negros and left the club in July 2018.

He had a brief stint with Kaya–Iloilo, joining the club in early 2020. He returned to Japan within the year to join Tokyo Verdy's beach soccer team in September.

Club statistics

References

External links

1990 births
Living people
Association football people from Okinawa Prefecture
Japanese footballers
J1 League players
J2 League players
Japan Football League players
Kyoto Sanga FC players
FC Ryukyu players
Japanese expatriate footballers
Japanese expatriate sportspeople in the Philippines
Expatriate footballers in the Philippines
JPV Marikina F.C. players
Ceres–Negros F.C. players
Association football forwards